The urinary system, also known as the urinary tract or renal system, consists of the kidneys, ureters, bladder, and the urethra. The purpose of the urinary system is to eliminate waste from the body, regulate blood volume and blood pressure, control levels of electrolytes and metabolites, and regulate blood pH. The urinary tract is the body's drainage system for the eventual removal of urine. The kidneys have an extensive blood supply via the renal arteries which leave the kidneys via the renal vein. Each kidney consists of functional units called nephrons. Following filtration of blood and further processing, wastes (in the form of urine) exit the kidney via the ureters, tubes made of smooth muscle fibres that propel urine towards the urinary bladder, where it is stored and subsequently expelled from the body by urination (voiding). The female and male urinary system are very similar, differing only in the length of the urethra.

Urine is formed in the kidneys through a filtration of blood. The urine is then passed through the ureters to the bladder, where it is stored. During urination, the urine is passed from the bladder through the urethra to the outside of the body.

8002,000 milliliters (mL) of urine are normally produced every day in a healthy human. This amount varies according to fluid intake and kidney function.

Structure

The urinary system refers to the structures that produce and transport urine to the point of excretion. In the human urinary system there are two kidneys that are located between the dorsal body wall and parietal peritoneum on both the left and right sides. 

The formation of urine begins within the functional unit of the kidney, the nephrons. Urine then flows through the nephrons, through a system of converging tubules called collecting ducts. These collecting ducts then join together to form the minor calyces, followed by the major calyces that ultimately join the renal pelvis. From here, urine continues its flow from the renal pelvis into the ureter, transporting urine into the urinary bladder. The anatomy of the human urinary system differs between males and females at the level of the urinary bladder. In males, the urethra begins at the internal urethral orifice in the trigone of the bladder, continues through the external urethral orifice, and then becomes the prostatic, membranous, bulbar, and penile urethra. Urine exits through the external urethral meatus. The female urethra is much shorter, beginning at the bladder neck and terminating in the vaginal vestibule.

Development

Microanatomy

Under microscopy, the urinary system is covered in a unique lining called urothelium, a type of transitional epithelium. Unlike the epithelial lining of most organs, transitional epithelium can flatten and distend. Urothelium covers most of the urinary system, including the renal pelvis, ureters, and bladder.

Function
The main functions of the urinary system and its components are to:
 Regulate blood volume and composition (e.g. sodium, potassium and calcium) 
 Regulate blood pressure.
 Regulate pH homeostasis of the blood. 
 Contributes to the production of red blood cells by the kidney.
 Helps synthesize calcitriol (the active form of Vitamin D). 
 Stores waste products (mainly urea and uric acid) before it and other products are removed from the body.

Urine formation

Average urine production in adult humans is about 12 litres (L) per day, depending on state of hydration, activity level, environmental factors, weight, and the individual's health. Producing too much or too little urine requires medical attention. Polyuria is a condition of excessive urine production (> 2.5 L/day). Oliguria when < 400 mL (millilitres) are produced, and anuria one of < 100 mL per day.

The first step in urine formation is the filtration of blood in the kidneys. In a healthy human the kidney receives between 12 and 30% of cardiac output, but it averages about 20% or about 1.25 L/min.

The basic structural and functional unit of the kidney is the nephron. Its chief function is to regulate the concentration of water and soluble substances like sodium by filtering the blood, reabsorbing what is needed and excreting the rest as urine.

In the first part of the nephron, Bowman's capsule filters blood from the circulatory system into the tubules. Hydrostatic and osmotic pressure gradients facilitate filtration across a semipermeable membrane. The filtrate includes water, small molecules, and ions that easily pass through the filtration membrane. However larger molecules such as proteins and blood cells are prevented from passing through the filtration membrane. The amount of filtrate produced every minute is called the glomerular filtration rate or GFR and amounts to 180 litres per day. About 99% of this filtrate is reabsorbed as it passes through the nephron and the remaining 1% becomes urine.

The urinary system is regulated by the endocrine system by hormones such as antidiuretic hormone, aldosterone, and parathyroid hormone.

Regulation of concentration and volume

The urinary system is under influence of the circulatory system, nervous system, and endocrine system.

Aldosterone plays a central role in regulating blood pressure through its effects on the kidney. It acts on the distal tubules and collecting ducts of the nephron and increases reabsorption of sodium from the glomerular filtrate. Reabsorption of sodium results in retention of water, which increases blood pressure and blood volume. Antidiuretic hormone (ADH), is a neurohypophysial hormone found in most mammals. Its two primary functions are to retain water in the body and vasoconstriction. Vasopressin regulates the body's retention of water by increasing water reabsorption in the collecting ducts of the kidney nephron. Vasopressin increases water permeability of the kidney's collecting duct and distal convoluted tubule by inducing translocation of aquaporin-CD water channels in the kidney nephron collecting duct plasma membrane.

Urination

Urination, also sometimes referred to as micturition, is the ejection of urine from the urinary bladder through the urethra to the outside of the body. In healthy humans (and many other animals), the process of urination is under voluntary control. In infants, some elderly individuals, and those with neurological injury, urination may occur as an involuntary reflex. Physiologically, micturition involves coordination between the central, autonomic, and somatic nervous systems. Brain centers that regulate urination include the pontine micturition center, periaqueductal gray, and the cerebral cortex. In placental mammals the male ejects urine through the penis, and the female through the vulva.

Clinical significance
 

Urologic disease can involve congenital or acquired dysfunction of the urinary system. As an example, urinary tract obstruction is a urologic disease that can cause urinary retention.

Diseases of the kidney tissue are normally treated by nephrologists, while diseases of the urinary tract are treated by urologists. Gynecologists may also treat female urinary incontinence.

Diseases of other bodily systems also have a direct effect on urogenital function.  For instance, it has been shown that protein released by the kidneys in diabetes mellitus sensitizes the kidney to the damaging effects of hypertension.

Diabetes also can have a direct effect in urination due to peripheral neuropathies, which occur in some individuals with poorly controlled blood sugar levels.

Urinary incontinence can result from a weakening of the pelvic floor muscles caused by factors such as pregnancy, childbirth, aging, and being overweight. Findings recent systematic reviews demonstrate that behavioral therapy generally results in improved urinary incontinence outcomes, especially for stress and urge UI, than medications alone. Pelvic floor exercises known as Kegel exercises can help in this condition by strengthening the pelvic floor. There can also be underlying medical reasons for urinary incontinence which are often treatable. In children, the condition is called enuresis.

Some cancers also target the urinary system, including bladder cancer, kidney cancer, ureteral cancer, and urethral cancer. Due to the role and location of these organs, treatment is often complicated.

History
Kidney stones have been identified and recorded about as long as written historical records exist. The urinary tract including the ureters, as well as their function to drain urine from the kidneys, has been described by Galen in the second century AD.

The first to examine the ureter through an internal approach, called ureteroscopy, rather than surgery was Hampton Young in 1929. This was improved on by VF Marshall who is the first published use of a flexible endoscope based on fiber optics, which occurred in 1964. The insertion of a drainage tube into the renal pelvis, bypassing the ureters and urinary tract, called nephrostomy, was first described in 1941. Such an approach differed greatly from the open surgical approaches within the urinary system employed during the preceding two millennia.

See also 
Excretory system
Major systems of the human body

References

External links